Héctor Miguel Bautista López (born 5 September 1960) is a Mexican left-wing politician affiliated with the Party of the Democratic Revolution (PRD) who in 2006 was elected to the upper house of the Mexican Congress.

Personal life and education
Bautista López has a bachelor's degree in agriculture from the National Autonomous University of Mexico.

Political career
Bautista has been an active left-wing politician in the State of México. He occupied different positions within the Mexican Workers' Party including head of the party in the State of México. He was a founder of the Mexican Socialist Party (PMS) and a founder of the Party of the Democratic Revolution.

In 2000, he was elected municipal president (mayor) of Nezahualcóyotl. He was also in the Chamber of Deputies of Mexico.

References

Living people
1960 births
Party of the Democratic Revolution politicians
Members of the Chamber of Deputies (Mexico)
Municipal presidents in the State of Mexico
Members of the Senate of the Republic (Mexico)
People from Nezahualcóyotl
Politicians from the State of Mexico
20th-century Mexican politicians
21st-century Mexican politicians